Pine is an unincorporated community in Camp County, in the U.S. state of Texas. According to the Handbook of Texas, the community had a population of 78 in 2000.

History
The area in what is known as Pine today was first settled in the late 1830s. A post office was established at Pine in 1848 and remained in operation until 1871. It was originally named Pine Tree for the various pine trees in the area. It then became a railroad switch station on the Texas and St. Louis Railway in the 1870s and was named Cannon Switch for local pastor Burrell Cannon. He also served as the president of the Ezekiel Airship Company. The post office reopened in 1892 under the name Pine and remained in operation until 1954. The community had two churches, a lumber mill, a shingle mill, and 100 residents in 1896. It then dropped to 55 in 1925 and went down to 30 two decades later. The area surrounding the community remained heavily populated throughout the 1930s, even though the community's population declined. Pine made a comeback in the 1960s and had 98 residents by 1970. Its population went down to 78 from 1972 through 2000. There were no businesses in the community during the 1970s, but in 1983, it had a church, a community center, and a small store.

Geography

Education
Pine had two schools in 1935 that taught 141 students. Since 1955, Pine has been served by the Pittsburg Independent School District.

References

Unincorporated communities in Camp County, Texas
Unincorporated communities in Texas